Tangeni Shipahu (born 3 September 1987, in Swakopmund) is a Namibian football striker.

International goals

References

External links

1987 births
Living people
Namibian men's footballers
Namibia international footballers
Namibian expatriate sportspeople in South Africa
Namibian expatriate footballers
United Africa Tigers players
AmaZulu F.C. players
Association football forwards
Expatriate soccer players in South Africa
Sportspeople from Swakopmund
Expatriate footballers in Thailand
Tangeni Shipahu
Tangeni Shipahu
Tangeni Shipahu
Tangeni Shipahu
Namibian expatriate sportspeople in Thailand